omega-Grammotoxin SIA (ω-grammotoxin SIA) is a protein toxin that inhibits P, Q, and N  voltage-gated calcium channels (Ca2+ channels) in neurons.

Sources 

The source of ω-grammotoxin SIA is the  venom of a   tarantula  spider (Grammostola rosea).

Chemistry 

Amino acid sequence:  Asp-Cys-Val-Arg-Phe-Trp-Gly-Lys-Cys-Ser-Gln-Thr-Ser-Asp-Cys-Cys-Pro-His-Leu-Ala-Cys-Lys-Ser-Lys-Trp-Pro-Arg-Asn-Ile-Cys-Val-Trp-Asp-Gly-Ser-Val
 
Molecular formula: C177H268N52O50S6
 
ω-Grammotoxin SIA can be purified from Grammostola rosea venom by reverse phase high performance liquid chromatography.

Target 

ω-Grammotoxin SIA is a 36 amino acid residue protein toxin from spider venom that inhibits P, Q, and  N-type  voltage-gated calcium channels in neurons. It binds to the channels with high affinity (if closed).  It also binds to potassium channels but with lower affinity than to the calcium channels.
The toxin binding site has high affinity when channels are in closed states and low affinity when channels are activated. (4)

Mode of action 

It is believed that ω-grammotoxin SIA inhibits channel function by binding with high affinity to closed, resting states of the channel and that bound toxin makes it more difficult for channels to be opened by  depolarization, so much larger   depolarizations are required for channel activation.

References

Spider toxins
Ion channel toxins